Cecilia Nina Bowes-Lyon, Countess of Strathmore and Kinghorne  ( Cavendish-Bentinck; 11 September 1862 – 23 June 1938) was the mother of Queen Elizabeth The Queen Mother, and maternal grandmother and godmother of Queen Elizabeth II.

Life
She was born in Belgravia, Westminster, the eldest daughter of the Rev. Charles Cavendish-Bentinck (grandson of British Prime Minister William Cavendish-Bentinck, 3rd Duke of Portland) and his wife, Louisa (née Burnaby).

On 16 July 1881, she married Claude Bowes-Lyon, Lord Glamis, at St Peter's Church, Petersham, Surrey, and they had ten children. Claude inherited his father's title of Earl of Strathmore and Kinghorne in 1904, whereupon Cecilia became Countess of Strathmore and Kinghorne.

The Strathmore estates included two grand houses and their surroundings: Glamis Castle and St Paul's Walden Bury. Cecilia was a gregarious and accomplished hostess who played the piano exceptionally well. Her houses were run with meticulous care and a practical approach, and she was responsible for designing the Italian Garden at Glamis. She was deeply religious, a keen gardener and embroiderer, and preferred a quiet family life.

During World War I, Glamis Castle served as a convalescent hospital for the wounded, in which she took an active part until she developed cancer and was forced into invalidity. In October 1921 she underwent a hysterectomy, and by May 1922 was in recovery. In January 1923 she celebrated the engagement of her youngest daughter, Elizabeth, to the King's son, Prince Albert, Duke of York, later George VI. When asked by pressmen for a photograph during the Edward VIII abdication crisis, she reportedly said, "I shouldn't waste a photograph on me." At the coronation of their son-in-law and daughter, the Earl and the Countess were seated in the royal box, along with the immediate royal family.

Death
Lady Strathmore suffered a heart attack in April 1938 during the wedding of her granddaughter, Anne Bowes-Lyon (later Princess of Denmark), to Viscount Anson. She died 8 weeks later at 38 Cumberland Mansions, Bryanston Street, in London, at the age of 75. Lady Strathmore outlived four of her ten children. She was buried on 27 June 1938 at Glamis Castle.

Issue

Ancestry

References

Sources
 Davies, Edward J., "Some Connections of the Birds of Warwickshire", The Genealogist, 26(2012):58–76
 Forbes, Grania, My Darling Buffy: The Early Life of The Queen Mother (Headline Book Publishing, 1999); 
 Vickers, Hugo, Elizabeth: The Queen Mother (Arrow Books/Random House, 2006); 

Cecilia Bowes-Lyon, Countess of Strathmore and Kinghorne
British countesses
Scottish countesses
Dames Grand Cross of the Royal Victorian Order
Dames of Grace of the Order of St John
1862 births
1938 deaths
Cecilia Bowes-Lyon, Countess of Strathmore and Kinghorne
People from Westminster
19th-century Scottish people
19th-century Scottish women
20th-century Scottish people
20th-century Scottish women
Wives of knights